The 1999 finals series of the Australian Football League began on 3 September 1999 and ended with the 103rd AFL Grand Final at the Melbourne Cricket Ground on 25 September 1999 contested between the Kangaroos and Carlton. The Kangaroos, (formerly and later known as North Melbourne), emerged victorious to claim their fourth VFL/AFL Premiership.

The top eight teams on the home and away rounds (regular season) ladder qualified for the Finals Series.

Final Ladder 1999 

Essendon finished one game clear on top of the ladder with 18 wins, and thus claimed its 15th minor premiership. In fourth place were the  who finished with 15 wins and a draw. The following three teams (and ) finished with 12 wins each, separated by percentage. (with 11 wins) rounded out the Eight.
<br/ >

According to the McIntyre final eight system, this was how the first week of finals matches were arranged:

 Essendon vs. Sydney
 Kangaroos vs. Port Adelaide
 Brisbane Lions vs. Carlton
 Western Bulldogs vs. West Coast

The 1999 finals series was probably best remembered by the preliminary final boilover, in which  upset minor premier Essendon by one point at the MCG, which qualified them for an unexpected Grand Final appearance against the Kangaroos.

The 1999 AFL season would also be the last season which used the McIntyre system. It was replaced the following year with the AFL final eight system.

Match Reports

Qualifying Final: Western Bulldogs vs. West Coast

Qualifying Final: Kangaroos vs. Port Adelaide 

|- bgcolor="#CCCCFF"
| Home team
| Score
| Away team
| Score
| Venue
| Attendance
| Date
|- bgcolor="#FFFFFF"
| 
| 15.10 (100)
| 
| 8.8 (56)
| MCG
| 31,476
| Saturday, 4 September

Qualifying Final: Brisbane Lions vs. Carlton 

|- bgcolor="#CCCCFF"
| Home team
| Score
| Away team
| Score
| Venue
| Attendance
| Date
|- bgcolor="#FFFFFF"
| 
| 20.18 (138)
| 
| 8.17 (65)
| The Gabba
| 26,112
| Saturday, 4 September

Qualifying Final: Essendon vs. Sydney 

|- bgcolor="#CCCCFF"
| Home team
| Score
| Away team
| Score
| Venue
| Attendance
| Date
|- bgcolor="#FFFFFF"
| 
| 18.15 (123)
| 
| 7.12 (54)
| MCG
| 57,687
| Sunday, 5 September

Semi-final: West Coast vs. Carlton 

|- bgcolor="#CCCCFF"
| Home team
| Score
| Away team
| Score
| Venue
| Attendance
| Date
|- bgcolor="#FFFFFF"
| 
| 10.10 (70)
| 
| 18.16 (124)
| MCG
| 55,682
| Saturday, 11 September

Semi-final: Brisbane Lions vs. Western Bulldogs 

|- bgcolor="#CCCCFF"
| Home team
| Score
| Away team
| Score
| Venue
| Attendance
| Date
|- bgcolor="#FFFFFF"
| 
| 19.12 (126)
| 
| 10.13 (73)
| The Gabba
| 24,045
| Saturday, 11 September

Preliminary Final: Kangaroos vs. Brisbane 

|- bgcolor="#CCCCFF"
| Home team
| Score
| Away team
| Score
| Venue
| Attendance
| Date
|- bgcolor="#FFFFFF"
| 
| 19.9 (123)
| 
| 11.12 (78)
| MCG
| 61,031
| Friday, 17 September

Preliminary Final: Essendon vs. Carlton 

|- bgcolor="#CCCCFF"
| Home team
| Score
| Away team
| Score
| Venue
| Attendance
| Date
|- bgcolor="#FFFFFF"
| 
| 14.19 (103)
| 
| 16.8 (104)
| MCG
| 80,519
| Saturday, 18 September

Grand Final: Kangaroos vs. Carlton 

|- bgcolor="#CCCCFF"
| Home team
| Score
| Away team
| Score
| Venue
| Attendance
| Date
|- bgcolor="#FFFFFF"
| 
| 19.10 (124)
| 
| 12.17 (89)
| MCG
| 94,228
| Saturday, 25 September

References

Bibliography 
 

1999 in Australian rules football
Finals Series